Port Albert is situated on the shores of the Kaipara Harbour, approximately 8 kilometres west of Wellsford, in the Auckland Region of New Zealand. Originally called Albertland, it was the last of the major organised British settlements in New Zealand.<ref name="ablertlanders">{{cite book |last1=Brett |first1=Sir Henry |last2=Hook |first2=Henry |title=The Albertlanders: Brave Pioneers of the 'Sixties |publisher=Capper Press |location=Christchurch |date=1979}}</ref>

The area has become known for its well draining soil, which has made it good agricultural land.

History

In 1861 William Rawson Brame, a Birmingham Baptist minister, founded the Albertland Special Settlement Association, organising non-conformist immigrants to come to New Zealand as part of the last organised British settlement in New Zealand. They included farmers, carpenters, servants, butchers, joiners, cabinetmakers, millers, drapers, sawyers, clerks and many other trades.Brett, H., Hook, H.( 1929). The Albertlanders. Auckland New Zealand: The Brett Printing Company Limited. Albertland, named for Prince Albert, was planned as a large-scale settlement, and was one of the final settlements sponsored by the colonial government.

The Albertlanders set sail for New Zealand on 29 May 1862, aboard numerous ships including the Matilda Wattenbach, Hanover and William Miles.  The Matilda Wattenbach, which in some documents is referred to simply as the Matilda'', made it to Auckland first on 8 September 1862, and the new settlers made their own way to the settlement of Albertland (now known as Port Albert).

On 21 January 1862, a party set out from Auckland heading northward along the east coast in a whale boat.  On board the boat were two Non-Conformist Settlement Associates, a provincial Surveyor and five men rowing the boat.  The group landed late that afternoon at Wade (now Silverdale) where they stayed the night before setting off the next day on foot up the Waiwera Valley having to cross several creeks on the way.  From there they set off by boat heading for the Puhoi river where there was a Maori settlement.  This area of land would have been suitable for the Albertland settlement due to it covering both the west and east of the Island; however, the Maori had a claim to the water frontage of both sides of the island so landing would have been hard for the settlers.  The explorers then surveyed a block just north of Helensville called the Komokoriki block. This block was so overgrown that the explorers struggled to walk through the dense bush and it would require too much work to bring it back to productive farming land.  They then heard of the Oruawharo block on the Kaipara Harbour and decided to head back to Silverdale to get fresh supplies before attempting the five-day trek to this block.

A sign at Port Albert concludes: 
More immigrant ships followed, but isolation and difficulties of access hindered progress and the original plans for a township at Port Albert were thwarted.

Demographics
Port Albert is part of the larger Okahukura Peninsula statistical area.

Port Albert had a population of 120 at the 2018 New Zealand census, a decrease of 6 people (−4.8%) since the 2013 census, and an increase of 24 people (25.0%) since the 2006 census. There were 45 households, comprising 60 males and 60 females, giving a sex ratio of 1.0 males per female. The median age was 46.7 years (compared with 37.4 years nationally), with 24 people (20.0%) aged under 15 years, 15 (12.5%) aged 15 to 29, 63 (52.5%) aged 30 to 64, and 24 (20.0%) aged 65 or older.

Ethnicities were 87.5% European/Pākehā, 22.5% Māori, 0.0% Pacific peoples, 2.5% Asian, and 2.5% other ethnicities. People may identify with more than one ethnicity.

Although some people chose not to answer the census's question about religious affiliation, 60.0% had no religion, 25.0% were Christian, 2.5% were Hindu and 2.5% had other religions.

Of those at least 15 years old, 12 (12.5%) people had a bachelor's or higher degree, and 18 (18.8%) people had no formal qualifications. The median income was $30,400, compared with $31,800 nationally. 21 people (21.9%) earned over $70,000 compared to 17.2% nationally. The employment status of those at least 15 was that 48 (50.0%) people were employed full-time, 12 (12.5%) were part-time, and 3 (3.1%) were unemployed.

See also
Edwin Stanley Brookes, Jnr.
Matakohe
Paparoa
Tapora
Wellsford

References

External links
 Albertland and Districts museum

Rodney Local Board Area
Populated places in the Auckland Region
Populated places around the Kaipara Harbour